The Vegas Rollers are a World TeamTennis (WTT) franchise founded in 2019, owned by the league. The team was one of two expansion teams to enter the league in 2019 alongside Orlando Storm. The Vegas Rollers will play their home matches at the Orleans Arena in Paradise, Nevada. The official Charity is the Marty Hennessy - Inspiring Children Foundation.

Team rosters

2019 roster
 Bob Bryan
 Mike Bryan
 Reilly Opelka
 Sam Querrey
 Monica Puig
 Evan Song
 Harriet Dart
 Asia Muhammad
 Matt Reid 
 Head Coach, Tim Blenkiron

References

External links
 

Sports teams in Las Vegas
World TeamTennis teams
Sports clubs established in 2019
2019 establishments in Nevada